Quanderhorn (titled The Quanderhorn Xperimentations for series 1 and Quanderhorn 2 for the second series) is a science fiction comedy radio series written by Andrew Marshall and Rob Grant. The first series was originally broadcast in the United Kingdom by BBC Radio 4 in 2018, and a second in 2020. The series has elements that pastiche Nigel Kneale's Professor Bernard Quatermass.

Plot
The series follows the adventures of Professor Darius Quanderhorn, a brilliant, but crazy, scientific genius who creates fantastic devices, and has assembled a team of assistants, including his part-insect "son", a recovering amnesiac, a brilliant scientist with a half-clockwork brain, and a captured Martian hostage. The year is 1952, but no one seems to have noticed that it has been that year for the past 65 years. In spite of Quanderhorn saving the world many times, the British government are tired of his eccentric behaviour, and have a mole in his team.

Cast
 James Fleet as Professor Darius Quanderhorn
 Ryan Sampson as Brian Nylon
 Cassie Layton as Dr Gemini Jannussen
 Kevin Eldon as Guuuurk
 Freddie Fox as Troy Quanderhorn
 John Sessions as Winston Churchill
 John Sessions as Jenkins

Episode list

Series 1
 It's Eating My Face
 Mummy! My Donkey's Head Is Exploding
 A Little Thing Like Chocolate Gates Can't Stop Us
 The Splattered Remains of Undentifiable Organs Incident All Over Again
 Fear! Terror! Gut-wrenching Horror! Arg Arg. Please!
 Dah dah dah dah dah dahh Dah dah dah dah dahhhh...

Series 2
 Killdiboos and Universibold Explodibangbang
 Shoveleth in More Hazelnuts!
 Wasp
 I Didn’t Say it was Well Cloaked
 Am I Actually the Other Half of Gemma Emma Emma?
 I Heregy Thind You Guilky

In other media

Books
Andrew Marshall and Rob Grant also created a novel based on series one entitled "The Quanderhorn Xperimentations" and released by Gollancz Publishers.

References

External links
 
 
 FantasticFiction.com: The Quanderhorn Xperimentations

British science fiction radio programmes
British radio dramas
2018 radio dramas
BBC Radio comedy programmes
BBC Radio 4 programmes
English fiction
2018 radio programme debuts